The megabyte is a multiple of the unit byte for digital information. Its recommended unit symbol is MB. Therefore, one megabyte is one million bytes of information. This definition has been incorporated into the International System of Quantities.

In the computer and information technology fields, other definitions have been used that arose for historical reasons of convenience. The standards bodies have deprecated this usage of the megabyte in favor of a new set of binary prefixes, in which this quantity is designated by the unit mebibyte (MiB).

Definitions
The unit megabyte is commonly used for 10002 (one million) bytes or 10242 bytes. The interpretation of using base 1024 originated as technical jargon for the byte multiples that needed to be expressed by the powers of 2 but lacked a convenient name. As 1024 (210) approximates 1000 (103), roughly corresponding to the SI prefix kilo-, it was a convenient term to denote the binary multiple. In 1998, the International Electrotechnical Commission (IEC) proposed standards for binary prefixes requiring the use of megabyte to denote 10002 bytes, and mebibyte to denote 10242 bytes.  By the end of 2009, the IEC Standard had been adopted by the IEEE, EU, ISO and NIST. Nevertheless, the term megabyte continues to be widely used with different meanings.

 Base 10
 1 MB =  bytes (= 10002 B = 106 B) is the definition following the rules of the International System of Units (SI), and the International Electrotechnical Commission (IEC). This definition is used in computer networking contexts and most storage media, particularly hard drives, flash-based storage, and DVDs, and is also consistent with the other uses of the SI prefix in computing, such as CPU clock speeds or measures of performance. The Mac OS X 10.6 file manager is a notable example of this usage in software. Since Snow Leopard, file sizes are reported in decimal units.
In this convention, one thousand megabytes (1000 MB) is equal to one gigabyte (1 GB), where 1 GB is one billion bytes.

Base 2

 1 MB =  bytes (= 10242 B = 220 B) is the definition used by Microsoft Windows in reference to computer memory, such as random-access memory (RAM). This definition is synonymous with the unambiguous binary unit mebibyte. In this convention, one thousand and twenty-four megabytes (1024 MB) is equal to one gigabyte (1 GB), where 1 GB is 10243 bytes (i.e., 1 GiB).

Mixed

Randomly addressable semiconductor memory doubles in size for each address lane added to an integrated circuit package, which favors counts that are powers of two. The capacity of a disk drive is the product of the sector size, number of sectors per track, number of tracks per side, and the number of disk platters in the drive. Changes in any of these factors would not usually double the size.

Examples of use

Depending on compression methods and file format, a megabyte of data can roughly be:
 a 1megapixel bitmap image (e.g. ~1152 × 864) with 256 colors (8 bits/pixel color depth) stored without any compression.
 a 4megapixel JPEG image (e.g. ~2560 × 1600) with normal compression.
 6seconds of 44.1 kHz/16 bit uncompressed CD audio.
 1minute of 128kbit/s MP3 lossy compressed audio.
 a typical English book volume in plain text format (500 pages × 2000 characters per page).

The human genome consists of DNA representing 800MB of data. The parts that differentiate one person from another can be compressed to 4MB.

See also
 Timeline of binary prefixes

References

External links
 Historical Notes About The Cost Of Hard Drive Storage Space
 the megabyte (established definition in Networking and Storage industries; from whatis.com)
 International Electrotechnical Commission definitions
 IEC prefixes and symbols for binary multiples 
Added Archived to How Many MB in a GB 

Units of information